WHBE (680 kHz) is an AM radio station broadcasting a sports format. Licensed to Newburg, Kentucky, United States, an unincorporated Census Designated Place (CDP) community in Jefferson County, that in 2003 merged alongside the rest of the county with Louisville, the station serves the Louisville area.  The station is currently owned by UB Louisville, LLC and features programming from ESPN Radio.

History
The station went on the air August 24, 1992 as WXKN, with a news/talk format, largely consisting of CNN Headline News programming. The call letters were changed to WNAI in 1997.  Word Broadcasting Network, owner of television station WBNA, acquired the station in 1999 and renamed it WJIE (sharing call letters with WJIE-FM, which is owned by a sister entity to Word Broadcasting Network). Three years later, the station was sold to The Walt Disney Company, who implemented its Radio Disney programming on March 16, 2002; on April 23, the call letters were changed to WDRD.

Disney put WDRD up for sale in late September 2010, and originally planned to temporarily shut the station down on September 30, 2010.  However, the station instead switched to ESPN Radio on September 29, (itself owned by Disney), which had previously been heard on WQKC before it was shut down by Cumulus Media the preceding August, after a deal to sell the station to Chad Boeger was reached.  Boeger acquired the station through UB Louisville, LLC; this entity shares several investors with Union Broadcasting, owner of Kansas City sports station WHB.  The call letters were changed to the current WHBE on February 18, 2011. Its sister station, WHBE-FM, 105.7 MHz, Eminence-Frankfort, KY which is audible in Louisville Metro city, was acquired from Davidson Media, LLC in April, 2014 (majority simulcast with WHBE-AM, some ESPN Deportes Spanish programming to appeal to Hispanic audience; station was formerly all-Spanish WTUV-FM)

References

External links

HBE
ESPN Radio stations
Radio stations established in 1992
1992 establishments in Kentucky
Former subsidiaries of The Walt Disney Company